This article gives a summary of teams, attendance numbers and final game scores from the Fukushima United FC 2017 football season.

Squad
As of 15 February 2017.

J3 League

References

External links
 J.League official site

Fukushima United FC
Fukushima United FC seasons